Nagaland Cricket Association is the governing body of the Cricket activities in the Nagaland state of India and the Nagaland cricket team (Men) and Nagaland women's cricket team (Women). It is affiliated to the Board of Control for Cricket in India as a full member.

References

Cricket administration in India
Cricket in Nagaland
Year of establishment missing